TV8 is a digital-terrestrial free-to-air Italian general entertainment TV channel owned by Sky Italia through its subsidiary company Nuova Società Televisiva Italiana S.r.l. The channel is allocated at number 8 of the Italian virtual channel list.

History
On 31 July 2015 Sky Italia took over ownership of the free-to-air MTV Italy. On 14 September 2015, MTV Italy was rebranded as MTV8 by Sky Italia.

On the same day, Viacom launched a new MTV-channel for Italy, MTV Next (now MTV), and is now only available as a subscription service on Sky. This ended an era where MTV Italy was available to the majority of homes across Italy free-to-air. The Music-station of Viacom in Italy, MTV Music remained available free to air until 1 July 2016, when it moved to Sky Italia.

The born with TV8

On 8 January 2016, Sky introduced new on-air graphics for MTV8 focusing on the number 8 and launched the channel's website.

On 18 February 2016, Sky changed the channel name to TV8.

Programming
TV8's programming consists essentially of reruns of old Sky programmes, comedy shows, crime shows, UEFA Europa League matches, delayed MotoGP and Formula 1, live Superbike World Championship and movies, making it the main barker channel of Sky Italia.

Documentaries
 Affari legali
 Baby Animals - Cuccioli petalosi
 Body Shock
 Cheaters - Tradimenti
 Cold blood: nuove verità
 Coppie che uccidono
 Eredità da star
 Finché morte non ci separi
 Finding My Father
 I'm a Stripper
 Intervention - Noi ti salveremo
 Istinto killer
 Lady Killer
 La dottoressa Garavaglia
 Mamme sull'orlo di una crisi da ballo
 Matrimonio a prima vista USA
 Nato per uccidere
 Non volevo è stata colpa sua
 Scandali ad Hollywood
 Stalker: attrazione fatale
 The Impostors - Le vite degli altri
 Vanity Fair Confidential

Show
 Cucine da Incubo Italia (Kitchen Nightmares Italy)
 Hell's Kitchen USA
 Hell's Kitchen Italia (st. 2+)
 House of Gag
 Italia's Got Talent (st. 7+)
 Planet's Got Talent
 TuttiGiorni's Got Talent
 Squadre da incubo
 Singing in the car
 Top 20 Countdowns
 X Factor

References

External links

Italian-language television stations
Sky Italia
Sky television channels
Television channels and stations established in 2015
Television channels in Italy